Cyril William Stocks (3 May 1905–1989) was an English footballer who played in the Football League for Nottingham Forest.

References

1905 births
1989 deaths
English footballers
Association football forwards
English Football League players
Nottingham Forest F.C. players
Grantham Town F.C. players